The Spartacist League of Britain (Spartacist League/Britain) is a Trotskyist political organisation in Britain.  It is the British section of the International Communist League (Fourth Internationalist).

History

Origins
The origins of the group derive from a 1964 group of activists within the American Socialist Workers Party who were expelled for refusing to support the leadership of the Cuban Revolution. The American group sent some of its members to the UK in 1975, to form the London Spartacist Group. In 1977 the group was joined by New Zealanders Bill Logan and Adaire Hannah, who had led the Spartacist League of Australia and New Zealand from 1972 to 1977, and who were "transferred to London at the behest of the Spartacist international leadership" with a view to strengthening the tendency's organisation there. "The Spartacist League/Britain was founded in 1978 as a fusion between the London Spartacist Group and the Trotskyist Faction (TF), which split from Alan Thornett's Workers Socialist League ...". The Trotskyist Faction, with about two dozen members, left the Workers Socialist League on 19 February 1978 and merged with the London Spartacist Group at a conference held seven weeks later over the weekend of 4–5 April. The new party claimed to have about fifty members in London and the Midlands.

Relationship to Labour Party
The Spartacist League "seeks to combat illusions in Labourite reformism in order to win the most conscious workers, minorities and youth to build a multiethnic workers party", on the model of the Bolsheviks, "devoted to rooting out the system of capitalist exploitation.". 

The Spartacist League has for this reason adopted the tactic of 'critical support' in elections for Labour and non Labour candidates. 

The group called for critical support for Labour in February and October as part of the 1974 United Kingdom general elections.

In the 1979 United Kingdom general election however the Spartacist League called for 'no vote for Labour', attributing Margaret Thatcher's election victory to Labour Party's betrayals. The Spartacist League did however give critical support to Workers Revolutionary Party (UK) candidates.

The Spartacist League did not endorse Labour candidates in the 1983 United Kingdom general election or the 1992 United Kingdom general election. In 1997 the Spartacist League gave critical support to Socialist Labour Party (UK) candidates.

Recent Activity

In the summer of 2017, the ICL questioned its past, believing that it had been, in the person of "a number of American cadres" penetrated by "the chauvinist Hydra" since 1974

Publications
The group published a monthly periodical called Spartacist Britain from 1978, which changed its title to Workers Hammer in 1984. It ran as a monthly publication and became a quarterly in Autumn 1999.  In the Spring of 2020 it was announced that Workers Hammer would reduce in frequency to two issues a year.

See also
Trotskyism
Dave Spart

References

External links 
Archive of recent issues of Workers Hammer
Catalogue of the Spartacist League archives, held at the Modern Records Centre, University of Warwick

United Kingdom
Political parties established in 1978
Trotskyist organisations in the United Kingdom
1978 establishments in the United Kingdom